T'Channa is a fictional character appearing in American comic books published by Marvel Comics.

Fictional character biography
T'Channa is the sister of T'Challa from Earth-2301.

Powers and abilities
T'Channa is a powerful user of magic.

Reception
 In 2022, Screen Rant included T'Channa in their "15 Most Powerful Black Panther Villains" list, and in their "10 Best Black Panther Comics Characters Not In The MCU" list.

References

Marvel Comics characters who use magic
Wakandans